Lyudmila Mikhailovna Arinina (born November 8, 1926,   Sinodskoye Village, Saratov Oblast, RSFSR, USSR) is a Soviet and Russian actress. She was named an Honored Artist of the RSFSR in 1976.

Early life 

Arinina was born on November 8, 1926 in Sinodskoye Village, Saratov Oblast. She is the daughter of painter Mikhail Alexandrovich Arinin  (1897 — 1967). In 1948, she graduated from the acting department of GITIS (course of Vladimir Belokurov).

Arinina debuted in 1967 in the film Four Pages of One Young Life (directed by Rezo Esadze). Since then, she has portrayed more than a hundred film roles, including roles in the films of director Pyotr Fomenko: For the Rest of His Life (1975), Almost Funny Story (1977),  Traveling on an Old Car  (1985). As of 2017, Lyudmila continued to act in films.

Personal life 
She first married Nikolai Mokin (1924 —  1984), theater director and actor. In 1989 she married Nikolai Semyonov, retired lieutenant colonel.

Selected filmography
 The Beginning (1970)
 About Love (1970)
 Drama from Ancient Life (1971)
 Belorussian Station (1971) 
 For the Rest of His Life (1975)
 A Declaration of Love (1977)
 An Almost Funny Story (1977)
 Investigation Held by ZnaToKi (1978)
 Waiting for Love (1981)
 Guest from the Future (1985)
 The Little Cat (1996)
 Life is Full of Fun (2001)
 Long Farewell (2004)
 Fartsa (2017)

References

External links
 
 Людмила Михайловна Аринина. Биографические сведения и фильмография.

1926 births
Living people
People from Saratov Oblast
Soviet film actresses
Soviet stage actresses
Russian film actresses
Russian stage actresses
Soviet television actresses
Russian television actresses
Russian Academy of Theatre Arts alumni
Honored Artists of the RSFSR
20th-century Russian women